A red flag warning is a forecast warning issued by the National Weather Service in the United States to inform the public, firefighters, and land management agencies that conditions are ideal for wildland fire combustion, and rapid spread. After drought conditions, when humidity is very low, and especially when  there are high or erratic winds which may include lightning as a factor, the Red Flag Warning becomes a critical statement for firefighting agencies.  These agencies often alter their staffing and equipment resources dramatically to accommodate the forecast risk. To the public, a Red Flag Warning means high fire danger with increased probability of a quickly spreading vegetation fire in the area within 24 hours.

The weather criteria for fire weather watches and red flag warnings vary with each Weather Service office’s warning area based on the local vegetation type, topography, and distance from major water sources.  They usually include the daily vegetation moisture content calculations, expected afternoon high temperature, afternoon minimum relative humidity and daytime wind speed.

Outdoor burning bans may also be proclaimed by local law and fire agencies based on red flag warnings.

In October 2019, the National Weather Service introduced an enhanced version of the warning, called extreme red flag warning. Analogous to the particularly dangerous situation (PDS) wording on a high-end severe weather watch, this means that conditions for fire growth and behavior are extremely dangerous due to a combination of strong winds, very low humidity, long duration, and very dry fuels. It was used for the first time on October 29, 2019.

A separate but less imminent forecast may include a fire weather watch, which is issued to alert fire and land management agencies to the possibility that Red Flag conditions may exist beyond the first forecast period (12 hours). The watch is issued generally 12 to 48 hours in advance of the expected conditions, but can be issued up to 72 hours in advance if the NWS agency is reasonably confident. The term “Fire Weather Watch” is headlined in the routine forecast and issued as a product, similar to the other primary fire warning terms. That watch then remains in effect until it expires, is canceled, or upgraded to a red flag warning.

See also
 Severe weather terminology (Canada)

External links
 Fire weather forecasts (Storm Prediction Center)

References

Fire prevention
Weather warnings and advisories
Wildfire suppression
National Weather Service